Mycolicibacter minnesotensis (formerly Mycobacterium minnesotense) is a species of bacteria from the phylum Actinomycetota that was first isolated from a sphagnum peat bog. It is pink-pigmented and grows at 27–34 °C. It has also been isolated from fresh produce and water treatment plant sludge.

References

Mycobacteriales
Acid-fast bacilli
minnesotensis
Bacteria described in 2013